Cooper Tire & Rubber Company is an American company that specializes in the design, manufacture, marketing, and sales of replacement automobile and truck tires, and has subsidiaries that specialize in medium truck, motorcycle, and racing tires. With headquarters in Findlay, Ohio, Cooper Tire has 60 manufacturing, sales, distribution, technical, and design facilities within its worldwide family of subsidiary companies, including the UK-based Avon Tyres brand, which produces tires for motorcycles, road cars, and race cars.

From 1960, the company was a publicly held corporation and was listed on the New York Stock Exchange until it was acquired by Goodyear in June 2021.

The company slogan is "The tire with two names ... the company and the man who built it."

History

Early history

The earliest corporate lineage for Cooper Tire was the M and M Manufacturing Company, founded in 1914 in Akron, Ohio, by John F. Schaefer and Claude E. Hart, who were related by marriage. Their new company produced tire patches, tire cement, and tire repair kits. They purchased The Giant Tire & Rubber Company of Akron, a tire-rebuilding business, in 1920, and in 1922 moved the business to Findlay, Ohio, at a site at the intersection of Lima and Western avenues that is still occupied by Cooper Tire, adjacent to The Cooper Corporation facility. The Cooper name originates from 1919 when Cincinnati auto-parts dealer I. J. Cooper formed the Cooper Corporation in Findlay, to manufacture new tires. The Cooper Corporation, the M and M Company, and the Falls Rubber company merged in 1930 to form the Master Tire and Rubber Company. The company name was changed to Cooper Tire & Rubber Company in 1946.

The Cooper oval trademark with the Cooper Knight headgear was first  registered and used in 1941. In those early years of the brand's identification, the logo also included a banner proclaiming the tires' "armored-cord" construction. The company's red, white, and blue logo became one of the more easily recognized emblems in the tire industry.

During World War II, the company, known as Master Tire and Rubber, manufactured pontoons, landing boats, waterproof bags and camouflage items, inflatable barges, life jackets, and tank decoys, as well as tires, to supply the Allied forces. The U.S. government recognized the company's contribution to the war effort in a 1945 ceremony bestowing the Army-Navy ‘E’ Award (for excellence). Soon after the war (1946), the company name was changed to Cooper Tire & Rubber Company.

Public company 
From 1946 to 1982, Cooper Tire was headed by a member of the Brewer family: first W.B. Brewer, then his sons, Wayne and Edward. Another son, Robert, was a vice president. W.B. Brewer took Cooper Tire public, and on July 11, 1960, the company was listed on the New York Stock Exchange under the ticker symbol "CTB", the "B" standing for "Brewer."  Throughout their tenure, the Brewers set a tone for hands-on leadership, management mingling with workers, and taking care of them. They built the trust and loyalty of the workers.

Under the Brewers' leadership, Cooper Tire grew significantly.  By 1983, the company joined the ranks of Fortune 500 companies as one of the largest industrial companies in the United States.

Acquisition by Goodyear 
On February 22, 2021, Goodyear Tire and Rubber Company announced that it entered into an agreement to acquire Cooper Tire for about $2.8 billion in cash and shares. The transaction was closed in June 2021, and was to result in Cooper shareholders owning around 16% of the combined company.

Foreign manufacturing plants and acquisitions

In 1997, Cooper purchased Avon Tyres Ltd., based in Melksham, England.

The company's largest growth acquisition occurred in 1999, when it bought the Standard Products Company, which increased Cooper's total workforce by 10,000 employees. Dearborn, Michigan-based Standard Products produced sealing, plastic trim, and vibration-control systems for the automotive original-equipment industry worldwide. The purchase included Standard Products subsidiaries Oliver Rubber Company and Holm Industries Inc. Oliver Rubber manufactured tread rubber and equipment for the truck-retread industry. Holm produced seals for home and commercial refrigerators.

In December 2003, Cooper agreed to a joint venture with Kenda Rubber Industrial Company to construct a tire-manufacturing plant near Shanghai.

In January 2005, Cooper agreed to purchase 11% of South Korea-based Kumho Tires Company, and also announced the formation of a new commercial division encompassing both Oliver Rubber Company and commercial tires.

In October 2005, Cooper announced an agreement to obtain 51% ownership in China's third largest tire manufacturer, Cooper Chengshan (Shandong) Passenger Tire Company Ltd., and Cooper Chengshan (Shandong) Truck Tire Company Ltd., to produce truck and passenger car tires for mainland Chinese and export markets. 

In 2007, Cooper started manufacturing in eastern China with Kenda Rubber Industrial Company, a company based in Taiwan. Cooper generates 25% of its global sales in China.

In 2007, Cooper sold its Oliver Rubber Company subsidiary, which produced tread rubber and retreading equipment, to Michelin for US$69million.

In December 2011, Cooper bought a unit of the Serbian tire manufacturing company Trayal Corporation from Kruševac, from the Bulgarian company Brikel EAD for a sum of $13million and invested as much as $50million. The newly established company, which has disintegrated from the Trayal Corporation, was named "Cooper Tire & Rubber Company Serbia" d.o.o. As of 2016, it has around 740 employees and annual revenue of $76million.

An Indian company named Apollo Tyres agreed to buy Cooper Tires for $2.5billion on June 12, 2013. This would have made Goodyear Tire & Rubber Co. the only major tire manufacturer left in the United States. On December 30, 2013, Apollo pulled out of the deal because Cooper had not disclosed vital information about its lack of control over its Chinese business. The Chinese plant went on an indefinite strike against the proposed acquisition, forcing Apollo to try to lower the $35-per-share bid in the original deal.

In June 2020, Cooper announced that it would open a new regional distribution center in Whiteland, Indiana, in early 2021. The new site will replace the company's facility in Franklin and increase product storage capacity.

Tire brands

Cooper Tires
Cooper Tires produces Cooper-branded tires for passenger cars, light trucks, sport utility vehicles, and commercial trucks.

Avon Rubber PLC
In 1997, the tire business of Avon Rubber of Melksham, Wiltshire, in the United Kingdom was sold to Cooper, so that Avon could concentrate on its core businesses of automotive components, technical products, and protective equipment. Cooper Tire remained a major employer in central Melksham, which was Cooper's European headquarters. In 2018, production was reduced to motorsport racing and motorcycle tires after non-specialist production was moved to Serbia, and in October 2022 the company announced plans to close the Melksham site by the end of 2023.

Other brands
In addition to Avon, Cooper Tire manufactures tires under the associated brand names Dean, Mastercraft, Mickey Thompson, Roadmaster, and Starfire.
Cooper Tire formerly manufactured all tires sold under the Sears Guardsman brand at Sears, Roebuck & Co. stores. Cooper manufactures tires for Discount Tire Company under the Arizonian brand name, and Futura Tires for Pep Boys.
Cooper Tire also manufactures Hercules branded tires in Findlay, Ohio. Cooper tires can be purchased at many tire retailers, such as Tire Discounters, Pep Boys, Discount Tire, and more.

Motorsports and sponsorships

Avon, then part of Avon Rubber PLC, was involved in Formula One in the 1950s (1954 and from 1956 to 1959), then in 1981 and 1982.

Cooper became the official tire of the A1 Grand Prix, dubbed the World Cup of Motorsports, for the series' initial 2005–06 season and was under contract to produce slick tires and treaded rain tires for the series championship until 2008.

Since 1982, Avon Tyres had been the sole supplier for the British Formula Three Championship. From the 2009 season onwards, these were rebranded "Cooper", as Cooper became the championship's official title sponsor, and was to until the end of the 2014 season at least. Avon Tyres was also the exclusive supplier for the FIA Formula Two Championship when revived in 2009 to 2012.

In April 2010, Cooper/Avon Tyres presented a written proposal to Formula One Team Association to be the official tire supplier for the 2011 Formula One season. This was ultimately rejected and Pirelli became the official tire supplier for 2011 onwards.

In the United States, Cooper became the official tire of the Champ Car Atlantic Championship in 2007. Cooper became the official tire of the IMSA Prototype Lites series (formerly IMSA Lites) in 2010. Cooper Tires is the official supplier of the Mazda Road to Indy formula ladder: USF2000 (since 2010), Pro Mazda (since 2013), and Indy Lights (since 2014).

As of 2014, Cooper is the official supplier of the FIA World Rallycross Championship. The Americas Rallycross Championship also uses Cooper Tires.

On July 7, 2017, it was announced that Avon Tyres would be the primary kit sponsor for Championship side Derby County for the 2017/2018 season.
In 2020, due to the COVID-19 pandemic, Cooper announced that the Road to Indy Presented by Cooper Tires will proceed through virtual races using racing simulation platform by iRacing.

Management and company personnel
Cooper has 10,540 employees as of its 2016 annual report. Bradley E. Hughes is Cooper's president and CEO.

See also
 List of tire companies

References

External links
Cooper Tire & Rubber Company official website
Cooper Tire & Rubber Company – Annual Reports

Goodyear Tire and Rubber Company
Companies formerly listed on the New York Stock Exchange
Manufacturing companies based in Ohio
Automotive companies established in 1914
American companies established in 1914
Tire manufacturers of the United States
Automotive companies of the United States
1914 establishments in Ohio
Findlay, Ohio
2021 mergers and acquisitions